Jimo District, formerly Jimo City, is a District of Qingdao, Shandong.

Location

Jimo is located in the southwest of the Shandong Peninsula, bordered by the Yellow Sea on the east and Mount Lao on the south.

Climate
Jimo has a moderate monsoon climate.

History
Jimo was established in the Eastern Zhou Dynasty, at which time it was the second largest settlement in Shandong. The Siege of Jimo in 279 BC, otherwise unremarkable, is remembered for the ruse that ended it.  Tian Dan was a general of the State of Qi who had just lost 70 cities to the Yan. When Jimo, their penultimate city, was under fire, he collected more than 1,000 oxen, tied sharp daggers to their ears, tied straw to their tails, and dressed them in colourful cloth to make them look like dragons. At dead of night the Qi set the tails alight and drove the oxen towards the enemy camp. The panicking enemy soldiers were wiped out, and the Qi regained all the lost cities.

German Colony and the Siege of Tsingtao 
On the 6th of March, 1898, the city of Tsimo (Jimo) became part of the Kiautschou Bay Leased Territory. By the time of the First World War, the Germans had set up a small outpost in Tsimo, which on the 13th of September, 1914, was taken by advancing Japanese cavalry during the Siege of Tsingtao. After its capture, Japanese cavalry and engineers alongside the 23rd Infantry Brigade would arrive at Tsimo on the 18th of September. During the siege, an airfield was built and by the 21st of September, Japanese Army Nieuport IV.Gs began operating from Tsimo in an unsuccessful attempt to bomb the German airfield and destroy the lone Rumpler Taube.  After the end of the war, the Kiautschou Bay Leased Territory (along with Tsimo) was ceded to Japan and returned to the Chinese in 1922.

Administrative divisions
As 2017, this district is divided to 8 subdistricts and 7 towns.
Subdistricts

Towns

Tourism
Aoshan Bay and Tian-Heng Island are its main tourism resources.

Transport
Line 11 (Qingdao Metro)

References

Official website

Aoshan Bay

Geography of Qingdao
County-level divisions of Shandong
Districts of China